Damanjan (also Romanized as Dāmanjān and Dāmenjān; also known as Damanyan and Dāmjān) is a village in Firuzeh Rural District, in the Central District of Firuzeh County, Razavi Khorasan Province, Iran. At the 2006 census, its population was 266, in 63 families.

References 

Populated places in Firuzeh County